Jarbas is a given name. It may refer to:

 Jarbas Passarinho (1920-2016), Brazilian military officer and politician
 Jarbas Faustinho (born 1939), known as Cané, Brazilian football manager and former winger
 Jarbas Vasconcelos (born 1942), Brazilian politician and lawyer
 Jarbas (footballer) (born 1957), Jarbas Tomazoli Nunes, Brazilian football forward
 Jarbas Mascarenhas (born 1980), Brazilian sprinter

See also
Jarba, Palestinian village